The Church of the Messiah, Birmingham was a Unitarian place of worship on Broad Street. The impressive Victorian Gothic church was constructed between 1860-1862 and straddled the Birmingham Canal. The congregation pre-dates the building, and has continued following its demolition in 1978. Those who worshipped there include politicians of local and national importance.

History
The foundation of the congregation goes back to 1692 when the first meeting house was built, afterwards known as the Lower Meeting House, Deritend. When the congregation outgrew this in 1732, they moved into a new chapel in Moor Street. By the 1860s this was also too small so a new church was commissioned. The Moor Street chapel was sold to a Roman Catholic congregation, and became St Michael's Church.

The new Church of the Messiah was built to designs by the architect John Jones Bateman, the contractors being George Branson and Edwin Gwyther. The foundation stone was laid on 11 August 1860 and the church opened on 1 January 1862, at a cost of £10,000. The site was unusual in that it straddled the Birmingham Canal, forming part of the Broad Street canal tunnel.

Early members of the congregation included members of the Martineau family who would produce many Birmingham Lord Mayors throughout the 19th and 20th centuries and Samuel Carter. Joseph Chamberlain, and his son Neville Chamberlain, prime minister 1937–1940, attended services in this church.

The congregation moved to purpose-built premises at Five Ways in 1973.

Organ
An organ was provided by Nicholson of Worcester in 1862, but by 1882 the congregation had commissioned a new one from William Hill and Son at a cost of £1571. This was rebuilt by Nicholson's in 1923. A specification of the organ can be found on the National Pipe Organ Register.

Ministers
John Sillitoe, 1692–1704 
Thomas Pickard, 1705–1747 
Samuel Bourn, 1732–1754
Samuel Blyth, 1747–1791
William Hawkes, 1754–1780   
Joseph Priestley, 1780–1791
John Edwards, 1791–1802 
David Jones, 1792–1795 
John Kentish, 1803–1853  
Joshua Toulmin, 1804–1815
James Yates, 1817–1826   
John Reynell Wreford, 1826–1831 
Samuel Bache, 1832–1868
Henry William Crosskey, 1869–1893
Lawrence Pearsall Jacks, 1894–1903
John Worsley Austin, 1903–????

Organists
John Gilbert Mills, ca. 1923

References

Churches in Birmingham, West Midlands
Churches completed in 1862
Unitarian chapels in England
Messiah
1692 establishments in England
Buildings and structures demolished in 1978
Demolished buildings and structures in the West Midlands (county)